Borgerhout is the smallest district of Antwerp, Belgium. , the district houses 45,769 inhabitants on 3,93 km².
It was an independent municipality until January 1983. The postal area code for Borgerhout is 2140.

Geography
Borgerhout is divided into two parts by a highway and the historical walls. 
The part inside those walls is "intra muros," meaning (within the walls). It is built around a big boulevard, the Turnhoutsebaan. The Turnhoutsebaan is the biggest shopping street, offering both food and clothing, in both Belgian and foreigner's stores.
"Intra muros" is the young and trendy part of Borgerhout, with a lot of so-called "hipster bars", although in the last few years "extra muros" is getting more popular and trendy, especially around the Te Boelaarpark with a lot of new businesses like bars and restaurants popping up.

Demographics
Borgerhout has an extremely diverse population, with 63% percent of inhabitants having non-Belgian ancestry. Of the nine districts of Antwerp, it has the highest population density.

History

Borgerhout was first mentioned in the year 1214 in an act written by the Duke of Brabant. It was then named 'Borgerholt'.

Etymology

"Borger" likely comes from the old world for citizen or city dweller. Currently, the Dutch word for this is "burger". It might also refer to the word "borgh", meaning a fortress or fortified building. Borghmeester (1254) or borgermeyster (1286) are mentioned in written sources as the word for "mayor", literally "master of the fortress" or "master of the citizens". "Hout" (or previously "holt) means "wood". It is similar to some naming conventions in English, for example "Hollywood". It refers to a time when Borgerhout was still much greener, and had not yet merged with greater Antwerp. It likely also explains the tree on the coat of arms.

People from Borgerhout

Born in Borgerhout 
 Bachir Boumaaza (born 1980), known by his pseudonym Athene, gaming social activist and internet personality
 Guillaume Geefs (1805–1883), sculptor 
 Floris Jespers (1889–1965), painter
 Nahima Lanjri (born 1968), politician
 Sister Leontine (1923–2012), pioneer of palliative care
 Milow (Jonathan Vandenbroeck) (born 1981), singer-songwriter
 André Nelis (1935–2012), sailor
 Joris Note (born 1949), writer
 Stan Ockers (1920–1956), cyclist
 Hugues C. Pernath (1931–1975), poet
 Maria Rosseels (1916–2005), journalist and actor
 Michel Seuphor (1901–1999), artist
 Paul van Morckhoven (1910–1990), dramatist and theatre critic
 Robert Van Straelen (born 1934), economist 
 Thomas Vinçotte (1850–1925), sculptor
 Eddy Wauters (born 1933), soccer player

(Former) inhabitants of Borgerhout 
 Tom De Cock (born 1983), writer and radio–DJ
 Saskia De Coster (born 1976), writer  
 Bart Martens (born 1969), politician and a member of the SP.A
 Alfred Ost, (1884–1945), artist
 Anne Provoost (born 1964), writer
 Wouter Van Besien (born 1972), politician, chairman of the ecologist party  Groen!
 Tom Van Laere (born 1974), musician
 Erik Van Looy (born 1962), film director 
 Rik Van Steenbergen (1924–2003), racing cyclist 
 Carl Verbraeken (born 1950), president of the Union of Belgian Composers

Gallery

References

External links

 

Districts of Antwerp
Populated places in Antwerp Province